Darrell John Steffensmeier (born 1942) is an American criminologist and Liberal Arts Research Professor of Sociology and Criminology at Pennsylvania State University.

Education
After receiving his bachelor's degrees in philosophy and history from St. Ambrose University, Steffensmeier received his M.A. and Ph.D. in sociology from the University of Iowa in 1970 and 1972, respectively.

Career
Steffensmeier joined the faculty of Pennsylvania State University in 1976, and was appointed Liberal Arts Research Professor there in 2015.

Research
Broadly speaking, Steffensmeier's research focuses on the relationship between societal categories, such as race, sex, age, and class, and crime. For example, he has published multiple studies examining gender differences in white-collar crime. These studies have shown that women tend to be involved in such crime at much lower rates than men, and than when women are involved in it, their positions tend to be less important and less profitable.

Honors, awards and positions
Two of Steffensmeier's books have won scholarship awards (one from the Society for the Study of Social Problems and one from the American Society of Criminology). He is a fellow of the American Society of Criminology and past president of the International Association for the Study of Organized Crime.

References

External links
Faculty page

1942 births
Living people
Pennsylvania State University faculty
University of Iowa alumni
American criminologists